Maiestas dorsalis is a species of bug from the Cicadellidae family that can be found in India, Japan, Korea, Malaysia, the Philippines, Sri Lanka, Borneo island, Taiwan, and Henan, province of China. It was formerly placed within Recilia, but a 2009 revision moved it to Maiestas.

References

External links

Insects described in 1859
Hemiptera of Asia
Maiestas